Sabrina Siani (born Sabrina Seggiani in Rome, 1963) is an Italian film actress. She also used pseudonyms such as Sabrina Sellers and Sabrina Syan. She starred in numerous films, mostly violent cannibal films and sexy barbarian "sword-and-sandal" movies, and most of her films were made in a three-year period between the ages of 17 and 20.  Siani retired from acting entirely in 1989, at age 26.

Her brief career included working with some of the most famous Italian horror film directors of the time, including Lucio Fulci, Umberto Lenzi, Antonio Margheriti, Joe D'Amato, Jesús Franco and Alfonso Brescia. Franco said in a recent interview that Siani's mother would always accompany her to the various shooting locations and get in the way, although she actually encouraged Franco to film her daughter naked.

Selected filmography
 Napoli... la camorra sfida, la città risponde (1979), Mafia film directed by Alfonso Brescia
 La liceale al mare con l'amica di papà (1980) aka High School Girl at the Beach with Dad's Friend
 Mondo Cannibale (1980), a.k.a. White Cannibal Queen, a.k.a. The Cannibals, directed by Jesús Franco
 Cannibal Terror (1981), co-written by Jesús Franco; used a lot of stock footage from Mondo Cannibale.
 Pierino medico della Saub (1981), directed by Giuliano Carnimeo
 2020 Texas Gladiators (1982) a.k.a. Anno 2020 - I gladiatori del futuro, directed by Joe D'Amato
 Daughter of the Jungle (1982), a.k.a. Incontro nell'ultimo paradiso/ Encounter in the Last Paradise, directed by Umberto Lenzi
 The Invincible Barbarian (1982), a.k.a. Gunan the Warrior, a.k.a. Gunan il guerriero, a.k.a. Gunan, King of the Barbarians; directed by Franco Prosperi
 Ator l'invincibile / Ator the Invincible (1982), a.k.a. Ator the Fighting Eagle, directed by Joe D'Amato
 The Sword of the Barbarians (1982), a.k.a. Barbarian Master, a.k.a. Sangraal, the Sword of Fire, directed by Michele Tarantini
 Blue Island (1982) a.k.a. Due gocce d'acqua salata, scripted by Dardano Sacchetti
 Hunters of the Golden Cobra (1982), directed by Antonio Margheriti
 The Throne of Fire (1983) directed by Franco Prosperi
 Conquest (1983) a.k.a. Conquest of the Lost Land, directed by Lucio Fulci
 Black Cobra (1984), directed by Umberto Lenzi, starring Fred Williamson
 Good King Dagobert (1984), directed by Dino Risi
 Aenigma (1987, uncredited cameo), directed by Lucio Fulci
 Ten Zan: Ultimate Mission (1988)

External links

References

1963 births
Living people
Actresses from Rome